Alex Menglet, born Alexei Menglet in Moscow  USSR in 1956, is an actor who has found success working in Australia.

Career
Menglet is best known for his roles as chef Ray "Gay Ray" Proctor in the 1984 season of Prisoner and more recently as Zoran Baranoff in the SBS series Kick. He has also appeared on Australian television series, Skyways, The Sullivans, Cop Shop and Carson's Law. His latest role was in the UK.TV mini-series False Witness. He has also appeared in the films Sky Pirates (1986), The Still Point (1986), Holidays on the River Yarra (1991) and He Died with a Felafel in his Hand (2001). Menglet also appeared as Joan Ferguson's father and fencing instructor, Ivan Ferguson in Wentworth.

Personal
Menglet has two daughters, Denisia and Katerina.

References

External links
 

Australian male film actors
Australian male soap opera actors
1956 births
Living people
Male actors from Moscow
20th-century Australian male actors
21st-century Australian male actors